The 2015 Coca-Cola 600, the 56th running of the event, was a NASCAR Sprint Cup Series race held on May 24, 2015 at Charlotte Motor Speedway in Concord, North Carolina. Contested over 400 laps on the 1.5 mile (2.42 km) asphalt speedway, it was the 12th race of the 2015 NASCAR Sprint Cup season. Carl Edwards won the race, his first of the season and first with Joe Gibbs Racing. Greg Biffle finished second. Dale Earnhardt Jr. finished third. Matt Kenseth and Martin Truex Jr. rounded out the top five.

Matt Kenseth won the pole for the race and led 26 laps on his way to a fourth-place finish. Martin Truex Jr. led the most laps for the second consecutive race with a race high of 131 laps on his way to a fifth-place finish. The race had 22 lead changes among nine different drivers, as well as eight caution flag periods for 39 laps.

This was the 24th career victory for Carl Edwards, first at Charlotte Motor Speedway and fifth at the track for Joe Gibbs Racing. This win moved Edwards up to 16th in the points standings. Despite being the winning manufacturer, Toyota left Charlotte trailing Chevrolet by 71 points in the manufacturer standings.

The Coca-Cola 600 was carried by Fox Sports on the broadcast Fox network for the American television audience. The radio broadcast for the race was carried by the Performance Racing Network and Sirius XM NASCAR Radio.

Report

Background

Charlotte Motor Speedway is a motorsports complex located in Concord, North Carolina, United States 13 miles from Charlotte, North Carolina. The complex features a 1.5 miles (2.4 km) quad oval track that hosts NASCAR racing including the prestigious Coca-Cola 600 on Memorial Day weekend and the Sprint All-Star Race, as well as the Bank of America 500. The speedway was built in 1959 by Bruton Smith and is considered the home track for NASCAR with many race teams located in the Charlotte area. The track is owned and operated by Speedway Motorsports Inc. (SMI) with Marcus G. Smith (son of Bruton Smith) as track president.

The 2,000 acres (810 ha) complex also features a state-of-the-art quarter mile (0.40 km) drag racing strip, ZMAX Dragway. It is the only all-concrete, four-lane drag strip in the United States and hosts NHRA events. Alongside the drag strip is a state-of-the-art clay oval that hosts dirt racing including the World of Outlaws finals among other popular racing events.

Kevin Harvick entered Charlotte with a 46-point lead over Martin Truex Jr. following his runner-up finish. Jimmie Johnson entered 48 back following winning at Kansas Speedway. Joey Logano entered 62 back. Dale Earnhardt Jr. entered 77 back following a third-place finish at Kansas.

For the weekend's race, the names on the windshield of the cars — in lieu of the drivers last names — had those of United States Armed Forces members who've died in the line of duty. “The NASCAR community rallying to honor the U.S. Armed Forces, past and present, has long been part of our sport’s heritage,” said Brent Dewar, NASCAR chief operating officer. “As part of NASCAR: An American Salute, 600 Miles of Remembrance represents a special moment in time as we pay tribute to service members who have sacrificed dearly for our freedom.” The Toyota pace car for the race will follow suit as well.

Entry list
The entry list for the Coca-Cola 600 was released on Monday, May 18 at 3:41 p.m. Eastern time. Forty-eight drivers were entered for the race. Kyle Busch, who has missed the first eleven races of the season following being injured in an Xfinity Series race at Daytona International Speedway, made his first Sprint Cup Series start since the 2014 Ford EcoBoost 400 at Homestead-Miami Speedway. Ryan Blaney made his first start since the 2015 GEICO 500 at Talladega Superspeedway in the No. 21 Wood Brothers Racing Ford. Jeff Gordon, whose first career win came in the 1994 Coca-Cola 600, made his 23rd and final Coca-Cola 600 start. Chase Elliott attempted and made his third career start in the No. 25 Hendrick Motorsports Chevrolet. Jeff Green attempted to make the race in the No. 30 Chevrolet for The Motorsports Group which hadn't been entered in a race since the 2015 Toyota Owners 400 at Richmond International Raceway. Mike Bliss returned to the seat of the No. 32 Go FAS Racing Ford that was las driven by Joey Gase in the 2015 SpongeBob SquarePants 400 at Kansas Speedway. Alex Kennedy drove the No. 33 Hillman-Circle Sport LLC Chevrolet that had been driven by Ty Dillon the previous week at Kansas. Travis Kvapil attempted to make his first start of the season in the No. 39 Hillman-Circle Sport LLC Chevrolet.

Practice

First practice

Qualifying

It's one lap. It's 600 miles Sunday, but it's a good place to start. A good way to start the weekend." “Second is nice, but look at the difference and how much I needed to pick up,” said Joey Logano. “That was a very fast lap by the 20, congratulations to them. I don’t know how to go that fast. We’ve got a couple weeks to figure out how to beat the 20 car. He’s very, very fast obviously. That was an amazing lap they ran there at the end.” “Just trying to have confidence,” Greg Biffle said after qualifying fourth. “We haven’t seen it in race trim yet, whether it’s us taking the tape off the front of it or what it might be – the change between our qualifying and race trim. We’re struggling a bit right now, so we’re just gonna work hard in practice and see what we can do.” None of the five Hendrick Motorsports drivers made it to the final round of qualifying for the first time since Sonoma last June. "I'm just disappointed in that second run out," said Gordon, who would start 18th. "The car never got down to the white line. It was real tight." Mike Bliss, Jeb Burton, Brendan Gaughan, Jeff Green and Travis Kvapil all failed to make the race.

Qualifying results

Practice (post-qualifying)

Second practice

Final practice

Race

First half

Start
The Coca-Cola 600 was scheduled to start at 6:20 p.m. but started one minute late with Matt Kenseth leading the field to the green flag. Kenseth wouldn't lead the first lap however, as teammate Carl Edwards took the lead. Kenseth found his way to the head of the field on lap 4. The first caution flew on lap 26. This was a scheduled competition caution that came after Charlotte Motor Speedway general manager Marcus Smith had turns 1 and 2 washed down overnight. Brad Keselowski was tagged for removing equipment from his pit box and restarted from the tail-end of the field. Aric Almirola was tagged for his crew being over the wall too soon and also restarted from the tail-end of the field.

The race restarted on lap 31 and Joey Logano shot out ahead of Kenseth to take the lead on lap 32. Denny Hamlin powered to the outside of Logano in turn 2 to take the lead on lap 44. Kevin Harvick took the lead on lap 65. As a round of green flag pit stops began, he surrendered the lead on lap 79 to make his pit stop and gave it to teammate Kurt Busch, who also was on pit road. This gave the lead to Keselowski, who pitted on lap 81 and gave the lead back to Harvick. The second caution flew on lap 90 when Jimmie Johnson got loose in turn 3 and spun out off the asphalt banking in turn 4. He saved the car and brought it to pit road. Keselowski chose not to pit and assumed the lead.

Second quarter
The race restarted on lap 95. Keselowski was no match for his teammate on fresher tires as Logano took the lead on lap 96. Kurt Busch, who took four tires during the previous caution, took the lead with ease on lap 98. The third caution flew on lap 136 when Justin Allgaier slammed the wall in turn 3.

The race restarted on lap 142, with Kurt Busch still out in front. The race settled into a green flag run. A second series of green flag pit stops began on lap 185, 15 laps to halfway. Busch surrendered the lead to pit on lap 190 and handed the lead to Johnson. He pitted on lap 191 and handed the lead to Edwards. He pitted the next lap and the lead cycled to Martin Truex Jr. Kasey Kahne was tagged for speeding on pit road and was forced to serve a drive-through penalty.

Second half

Halfway
The fourth caution flew on lap 229 when Trevor Bayne collected the wall in turn 3, leaving debris on the racetrack. Ryan Newman was tagged for speeding on pit road and restarted from the tail-end of the field.

The race restarted on lap 236. Kurt Busch took back the lead on lap 238. Truex took back the lead on lap 263. The fifth caution flew on lap 273 when Johnson hit the wall near the entrance to pit road. “We had a really loose racecar," Johnson explained. "We came in with an aggressive mindset to bring an aggressive setup in the car, drive aggressively and take chances. We don’t have anything to lose. Unfortunately, we didn’t get long enough into the race for the aggressive setup to come into play. Another 30/40 laps, we would have had the car right where we wanted it. I just didn’t make it there." "I could see it, I could see that opening and I could see the No. 2 (Brad Keselowski) pit," Johnson said. "I was frightened that I was going to get through that hole. It wouldn’t have been pretty for me, but to have teams and stuff there ... that was something I was staring at sliding for a long way. I was very thankful the SAFER barrier was there. I wish we could find a way to extend a wall out and redirect the car away from that opening, or close that opening up."

The race restarted on lap 279. The sixth caution of the race flew on lap 282 when Ryan Blaney hit the wall.

Fourth quarter

The race restarted on lap 292. The seventh caution of the race flew on lap 327 when Michael Annett, exiting turn 2, got loose and spun out on the backstretch.

The race restarted on lap 333. Hamlin took the lead from Truex Jr. with 67 laps to go. The eighth caution of the race flew with 64 laps to go when Ricky Stenhouse Jr. hit the wall in turn 4, leaving debris on the racetrack.

The race restarted with 59 laps to go. Hamlin made an unscheduled stop with 38 laps to go for a loose wheel. Martin Truex Jr. reassumed the lead. He pitted with 22 laps to go and handed the lead to Harvick. He pitted the next lap and gave the lead to Edwards who drove his way to score the win.

Post-race

Driver comments
"JGR is back and so is Toyota," said Edwards, who pitted on Lap 338 for fuel and was able to stretch it all the way to the finish as others ran out in the closing laps. "Darian Grubb is so good as a crew chief and when it comes down to fuel mileage, there isn’t anyone else I’d want calling the shots like he did tonight. This is such a huge win." "I was hoping the guys in front of me would run too hard and run out of gas," said Earnhardt. "We had to try to go for a win. We didn’t have a car fast enough to beat the '41' (Kurt Busch) or the '78' (Truex). We had to do something different. I like to gamble." Martin Truex Jr. finished fifth after leading a race high 131 laps. "I didn't even think fuel mileage strategy was an option," said Truex, who also led the most laps in the previous race at Kansas Speedway. "I felt I only needed to pass the No. 11 (Hamlin). We had a very fast car all night. It really hurts knowing that you had the fastest car and didn't win. I don’t know what to do about fuel mileage races. I’ve never ever in my entire career come out on the right end of them." "We didn't make many adjustments throughout the race, the car was fast from the get-go," noted Truex. "Whatever we needed to do, Cole (Pearn, crew chief) and his engineering staff made the right calls. This is a talented team that works extremely hard and I want nothing more than to drive their car to victory lane."

In his first Cup Series points race since his injury, Kyle Busch finished eleventh. He was able to run the whole race, but in the event he couldn't finish, Joe Gibbs racing had Erik Jones ready to complete the race.

Post-race penalties
On the Wednesday following the race, NASCAR handed out penalties to three Sprint Cup teams.

The No. 1 Chip Ganassi Racing Chevrolet team was penalized for modifying the right rear quarter panel wheel opening after qualifying inspection. The penalty is a P2 penalty that violates the following sections of the 2015 NASCAR rules:

12.1: Actions detrimental to stock car racing.

20.4.b: Body; All approved OEM-manufactured body components must be used as supplied except as required to stiffen, or to attach to other vehicle components. Tolerances from CAD surfaces and template tolerances are provided to allow for manufacturing, fabrication, and installation variability. Approved Parts: GM R: NSCS 0786. Part Name: Quarter Panel RS, Effective date Aug. 1, 2012.

20.4.2: Surface Conformance (a). Coordinate measuring machines, scanning equipment, and templates, among other tools, will be used to inspect body surfaces for conformance to the approved OEM and NASCAR CAD files.

As a result of the violations, crew chief Matt McCall was placed on probation through the remainder of the 2015 calendar year.

The other two teams – the No. 48 Hendrick Motorsports Chevrolet and the No. 51 HScott Motorsports Chevrolet – were assessed P1 penalties for receiving written warnings for consecutive events. Both cars failed to pass qualifying tech inspection on the first attempt two consecutive weeks.
Per Section 12.5.3.1 of the NASCAR rule book:

Warnings and P1 penalty options: b. Multiple warnings issued to the same member or team will result in one or more P1 penalties; c. If the same team receives two warnings during the same event or two warnings during two consecutive events, whether the events are championship or non-championship, then this may result in one or more ... P1 penalties at NASCAR's discretion.

As a result of these infractions, both teams received the last two choices in the pit stall selections, respective to qualifying results, for the following weekend's event at Dover International Speedway.

Race results

Race statistics
22 lead changes among 9 different drivers
8 cautions for 39 laps
Time of race: 4 hours, 3 minutes, 34 seconds
Average speed: 
Carl Edwards took home $363,390 in winnings

Race awards
 Coors Light Pole Award: Matt Kenseth (27.799)
 3M Lap Leader: Martin Truex Jr. (131 laps)
 American Ethanol Green Flag Restart Award: Martin Truex Jr. (30.194)
 Duralast Brakes "Bake In The Race" Award: Matt Kenseth
 Freescale "Wide Open": Matt Kenseth
 Ingersoll Rand Power Move: Dale Earnhardt Jr. (11 positions)
 MAHLE Clevite Engine Builder of the Race: Toyota Racing Development, #20
 Mobil 1 Driver of the Race: Martin Truex Jr. (132.8 driver rating)
 Moog Steering and Suspension Problem Solver of The Race: Dale Earnhardt Jr. (crew chief Greg Ives (0.160))
 NASCAR Sprint Cup Leader Bonus: No winner: rolls over to $90,000 at next event
 Sherwin-Williams Fastest Lap: Denny Hamlin (Lap 293, 28.797)
 Sunoco Rookie of The Race: Brett Moffitt

Media

Television
Fox Sports covered their 15th race at Charlotte Motor Speedway. Mike Joy, former crew chief Larry McReynolds, and five-time Coca-Cola 600 winner Darrell Waltrip had the call in the booth for the race. Jamie Little, Chris Neville, Vince Welch, and Matt Yocum handled pit road for the television side.

Radio
PRN had the radio call for the race, which was simulcast on Sirius XM NASCAR Radio. Doug Rice, Mark Garrow, and Brendan Gaughan called the race in the booth when the field was racing down the front stretch. Rob Albright called the race from a scaffold outside turn 2 when the field was racing through turns 1 and 2. Brad Gillie called the race from atop the turn 4 suits when the field was racing through turns 3 and 4. Brett McMillan, Jim Noble, Steve Richards, and Doug Turnbull worked pit road for PRN.

Standings after the race

Drivers' Championship standings

Manufacturers' Championship standings

Note: Only the first sixteen positions are included for the driver standings.

References

Coca-Cola 600
Coca-Cola 600
NASCAR races at Charlotte Motor Speedway